Dixie is an unincorporated community in Newton County, Georgia, United States, on Georgia State Route 142  east-southeast of Covington.

The community was named after Dixie, a nickname for the southeastern United States.

References

Unincorporated communities in Newton County, Georgia
Unincorporated communities in Georgia (U.S. state)